Ayodele "Ayo" Bakare (born 20 March 1960) is a Nigerian professional basketball coach. He is the current head coach of Ebun Comets and has coached  several years.

Club coaching career
Bakare has been the head coach of the Ebun Comets in the Nigerian Premier League.

Nigerian national team coaching career
Bakare was the former head coach of the senior men's Nigerian national basketball team. His Nigerian team qualified and competed at the 2012 Summer Olympics. He resigned has the teams Technical Director in 2014.

References

External links
FIBA Profile

1960 births
Living people
Nigerian basketball coaches